Boletellus ananaeceps (also spelled ananiceps) is a species of fungus in the family Boletaceae. First described by Miles Joseph Berkeley under the name Boletus ananaeceps in 1873, it was transferred to Boletellus in 1955 by Rolf Singer. It is found in Australia.

References

Fungi of Australia
ananaeceps
Fungi described in 1873
Taxa named by Miles Joseph Berkeley